James Ransome may refer to:
 James Ransome (illustrator), American illustrator of children's books
 James Ransome (manufacturer), English manufacturer of agricultural implements and components for railways
 James Allen Ransome, his son, English agricultural-implement maker and agricultural writer

See also
 James Ransone, American actor and musician